Hanco Charles Venter is a South African rugby union player, who most recently played with the . His regular position is scrum-half.

Career

Youth level

Sharks

Leopards

He joined Potchefstroom-based side the  during the 2015 Currie Cup qualification tournament that eventually went on to win the 2015 Currie Cup First Division. He featured in a total of seven matches during the 2015 Currie Cup qualification rounds and First Division proper and scored two tries for the side.

S.A. Under-20

He was included in the training group that toured Argentina in preparation for the 2013 IRB Junior World Championship. He was then included in the squad for the 2013 IRB Junior World Championship.

References

Alumni of Monument High School
South African rugby union players
Living people
1993 births
South Africa Under-20 international rugby union players
Rugby union scrum-halves
Rugby union players from Mpumalanga
Sharks (Currie Cup) players